Pecota may refer to:
PECOTA (Player Empirical Comparison and Optimization Test Algorithm), a statistical method for baseball analysis
Bill Pecota